Bernardo Colex Tepoz (born 3 July 1983) is a Mexican former professional road cyclist. He won the Mexican National Time Trial Championships four times between 2011 and 2014.

Major results

2006
 1st Stage 2 Vuelta a Chihuahua
 4th Road race, National Road Championships
 4th Overall Vuelta Sonora
2007
 1st Stage 3 Doble Sucre Potosí GP Cemento Fancesa
 3rd Overall Vuelta a El Salvador
 8th Overall Vuelta a Cuba
 8th Univest Grand Prix
2008
 2nd Road race, National Road Championships
 2nd Overall Tour de Beauce
1st Stage 1
 9th Overall Doble Sucre Potosí GP Cemento Fancesa
2009
 2nd Time trial, National Road Championships
 5th Overall Vuelta Ciclista Chiapas
1st Stage 5
 5th Overall Doble Sucre Potosí GP Cemento Fancesa
1st Stage 4
 7th Overall Vuelta Mexico Telmex
 10th Overall Vuelta a Bolivia
 10th Overall Vuelta a Cuba
2011
 1st  Time trial, National Road Championships
 1st Stage 6 (ITT) Vuelta Ciclista Chiapas
 2nd Overall Tour de Beauce
 10th Road race, Pan American Games
2012
 1st  Time trial, National Road Championships
2013
 1st  Time trial, National Road Championships
 3rd Overall Ruta del Centro
2014
 1st  Time trial, National Road Championships
 1st Overall Ruta del Centro
1st Stage 4
 Central American and Caribbean Games
3rd  Time trial
9th Road race
2016
 4th Time trial, National Road Championships

References

External links
 

1983 births
Living people
Mexican male cyclists
Sportspeople from Puebla
Competitors at the 2014 Central American and Caribbean Games
Cyclists at the 2011 Pan American Games